The Sord M23P was a "luggable" Japanese personal computer (weighed about 9 kg), manufactured by Sord Corp. from 1983. It was one of the first machines to use the 3½" disk drive produced by Sony.

Technical specifications

External links
 M23 Mark III
 Sord M23P

Personal computers